The Oak Creek Nature Reserve is a protected nature reserve in the Southern Tablelands region of New South Wales, in eastern Australia.

The reserve was created in January 2001 as part of the Southern Regional Forest Agreement. Prior to this, the area was Crown land.

See also

 Protected areas of New South Wales

References

Nature reserves in New South Wales
Protected areas established in 2001
Southern Tablelands
2001 establishments in Australia